Vachellia nilotica subsp. hemispherica is a perennial tree native to Pakistan.  Its uses include forage and wood.

References

nilotica subsp. hemispherica
Forages
Plant subspecies